The 1986 Virginia Slims of Oklahoma was a women's tennis tournament played on indoor hard courts at the Summerfield Racquet Club in Oklahoma City, Oklahoma in the United States and was part of the 1985 Virginia Slims World Championship Series. It was the inaugural edition of the tournament and ran from February 24 through March 2, 1986. Fifth-seeded Marcella Mesker won the singles title.

Finals

Singles
 Marcella Mesker defeated  Lori McNeil 	6–4, 4–6, 6–3
 It was Mesker's only singles title of her career.

Doubles
 Marcella Mesker /  Pascale Paradis defeated  Lori McNeil /  Catherine Suire 2–6, 7–6(7–1), 6–1

References

External links
 ITF tournament edition details
 Tournament draws
 Tournament fact sheet

Oklahoma
U.S. National Indoor Championships
Virginia Slims of Oklahoma
Virginia Slims of Oklahoma
Virginia Slims of Oklahoma
Virginia Slims of Oklahoma